ODINUS (Origins, Dynamics, and Interiors of the Neptunian and Uranian Systems) is a space mission concept proposed to the European Space Agency's Cosmic Vision programme. The ODINUS mission concept proposes to expand the Uranus orbiter and probe mission to two twin orbiters— dubbed Freyr and Freyja, the twin gods of the Norse pantheon.  Their primary mission would be to study Neptune and Uranus with one orbiter each. If selected, ODINUS would launch in 2034.

Instruments

The following six instruments are considered essential to the mission:
Camera (Wide and Narrow Angle) – Designed to image the planet at the same level of detail as missions to the two gas giants have provided.
VIS-NIR Image Spectrometer
Magnetometer – To study the magnetic fields of Neptune.
Mass Spectrometer (Ions and Neutrals, INMS)
Doppler Spectro-Imager – To take seismic measurements.
Microwave Radiometer
The following two additional instruments are strongly desired by the mission proposers:
Energetic Neutral Atoms Detector – To complement the measurements of the INMS.
High-sensitivity Accelerometer – To be used in the atmospheric descent phase.

See also
Exploration of Neptune
Exploration of Uranus

Uranus mission proposals
 Uranus Orbiter and Probe
 MUSE
 OCEANUS
 Uranus Pathfinder

References

Proposed space probes
Missions to Uranus
Missions to Neptune
Orbiters (space probe)
European Space Agency space probes